Liguria was a protected cruiser built for the Italian Regia Marina (Royal Navy). She was the fourth of six  cruisers, all of which were named for regions of Italy. Liguria was built by the Ansaldo shipyard in Genoa; her keel was laid in July 1889, she was launched in June 1893, and was commissioned into the fleet in December 1894.

Liguria served in a variety of roles throughout her career. She frequently was assigned to the main fleet, but in 1904 she was deployed to the American Station. In 1906, she conducted tests with coaling while at sea, and from 1908 to 1911, she was fitted with an experimental observation balloon. She saw extensive action during the Italo-Turkish War in 1911–1912. She took part in the seizure of Benghazi, provided gunfire support to the defenders of Tripoli, and conducted bombardments of Ottoman ports in western Libya and the Red Sea coast of Arabia. She was still in service during World War I as a training ship, but she did not see action during the conflict. Liguria was eventually sold for scrap in May 1921.

Design

The ships had a ram bow and a flush deck. Each vessel was fitted with a pair of pole masts. She had a crew of between 213 and 278.

Her propulsion system consisted of a pair of horizontal triple-expansion steam engines that drove two screw propellers. Steam was supplied by four cylindrical fire-tube boilers that were vented into two funnels.

Liguria was armed with a main battery of four  L/40 guns mounted singly, with two side by side forward and two side by side aft. A secondary battery of six  L/40 guns were placed between them, with three on each broadside. Close-range defense against torpedo boats consisted of eight  guns two  guns, and a pair of machine guns. She was also equipped with two  torpedo tubes.

Service history

Liguria was built by the Ansaldo shipyard in Genoa; her keel was laid on 1 July 1889. Shortages of funding slowed the completion Liguria and her sister ships. Tight budgets forced the Navy to reduce the pace of construction so that the funds could be used to keep the active fleet in service. It took nearly four years to complete the hull, which was launched on 8 June 1893. Fitting-out work proceeded much more quickly, and the new cruiser was ready for service a year and a half later. She was commissioned into the fleet on 1 December 1894.

In 1902–1903, Liguria was in the main Italian fleet; while in their normal peacetime training routine, the ships of the main fleet were kept in commission for exercises for seven months of the year. For the remaining five months, they were kept in a partial state of readiness with reduced crews. The ship was assigned to the American Station in 1904, the sole Italian warship in the region. In late 1906, the ship took part in experiments with coaling while underway. She towed the collier  at a speed of  while coal was transferred via the towing cable. Starting in 1908, Liguria was modified to operate an observation balloon. This service, which lasted until 1911, involved towing a "draken" balloon—invented by the Germans August von Parseval and Rudolf von Sigsfeld—to spot naval mines for the fleet.

At the outbreak of the Italo-Turkish War in September 1911, Liguria was stationed in Italian Eritrea with four other cruisers. She was transferred to the Mediterranean Sea, and on 18 October she joined the escort for a troop convoy headed to Benghazi. The convoy was heavily protected against a possible Ottoman attack; the escort comprised the four  pre-dreadnought battleships, two other cruisers, and five destroyers. The Italian fleet bombarded the city the next morning after the Ottoman garrison refused to surrender. During the bombardment, parties from the ships and the infantry from the troopships went ashore. The Italians quickly forced the Ottomans to withdraw into the city by evening. After a short siege, the Ottoman forces withdrew on 29 October, leaving the city to the Italians.

Liguria thereafter moved to Tripoli, where she supported the Italians who had taken the city against Turkish counterattacks. On 9 November, she, the armored cruiser , the minelayer , and the torpedo boat  provided critical gunfire support that broke a series of Ottoman attacks on the city. Liguria then returned to Tripoli with Carlo Alberto, the torpedo cruiser , and several torpedo boats while most of the Italian fleet returned to Italy for refitting. In January 1912, Liguria and her sister  were transferred to the Red Sea, along with a pair of fast mail steamers. The cruiser fleet in the Red Sea then began a campaign of coastal bombardments of Ottoman ports in the area. A blockade was proclaimed of the Ottoman ports, which included the cities of Al Luḩayyah and Al Hudaydah. The Ottomans eventually agreed to surrender in October, ending the war.

By the outbreak of World War I in August 1914, Liguria was assigned to the Third Division of the First Squadron as a training ship. Italy declared neutrality at the start of the war, but by May 1915, the Triple Entente had convinced the Italians to enter the war against the Central Powers. The old cruiser nevertheless saw no action during the war. She was sold for scrap on 15 May 1921 and was subsequently broken up.

Notes

References

External links
 Liguria Marina Militare website 

Regioni-class cruisers
Ships built in Genoa
Ships built by Gio. Ansaldo & C.
1893 ships